Walter A. Rutkowski (March 28, 1917 – August 8, 1975) was a member of the Ohio House of Representatives.

References

Democratic Party members of the Ohio House of Representatives
1917 births
1975 deaths
20th-century American politicians